Khara-Tumul is a rural locality (a selo) in Borogonsky 1-y Rural Okrug of Oymyakonsky District in the Sakha Republic, Russia, located  from Ust-Nera, the administrative center of the district and  from Oymyakon, the administrative center of the rural okrug. Its population as of the 2002 Census was 244.

References

Notes

Sources
Official website of the Sakha Republic. Registry of the Administrative-Territorial Divisions of the Sakha Republic. Oymyakonsky District. 

Rural localities in Oymyakonsky District